The King's Orchard is an historical novel by the American writer Agnes Sligh Turnbull (1888–1982) based upon the life of James O'Hara (1752?–1819), an American industrialist.

Set in Pittsburgh, Pennsylvania during the early years of the American republic, it is the fictionalized biography of O'Hara, who came to America shortly before the American Revolution from Ireland in 1772 to find adventure and fortune on the Indian frontier. He became a trader, soldier and industrialist. He traveled to Western Pennsylvania and helped to build Fort Pitt, which is now the site of modern-day Pittsburgh. O'Hara also became Washington's quartermaster during the war, and was prominent in the early history of Pittsburgh. The book includes characters such as George Washington, Guyasuta, Mad Anthony Wayne, and George Rogers Clark.

References

1963 American novels
Novels set in Pittsburgh
Biographical novels
Houghton Mifflin books
Novels set in the 1770s